Eythar Gubara (born 1988 in Khartoum, Sudan), is a Sudanese freelance photographer and activist for human rights. She is mainly known for her documentary images of everyday life in Sudan and of events during the Sudanese Revolution. In her work, she has placed a special focus on images of women, as well as on social diversity in Sudan.

Life and artistic career 
Gubara was born in Khartoum, Sudan, and holds a degree in computer engineering from a university in Saudi Arabia. After having started as a self-taught amateur photographer at age 20, she attended several workshops at the local German cultural centre – Goethe-Institut – where she joined other Sudanese photographers, who were developing their technical and artistic skills. As part of this group, she also participated in several exhibitions in Khartoum, organized by the German and French cultural centres.

Her images illustrating civic engagement for human rights and specifically gender inequality of women in Sudan have been shown by internet magazines such as human rights organization Dawn MENA and by the Goethe-Institut Sudan. Further, Gubara was pictured and quoted as part of Sudanese graffiti artist Assil Diab's team, standing before a wall painting of a protester killed during the revolution on BBC News 'Africa Week in Pictures' in July 2019. 

Since December 2019, Gubara has been living in Germany and continued her studies and work as photographer at the University of Fine Arts of Hamburg, supported by a scholarship. In June 2020, MOM Art Space in Hamburg showed her personal exhibition The Third of June, reflecting both political events in Khartoum before the Khartoum massacre, as well as images of people living under the former Sudanese government. 

In 2021, she was featured among other contemporary Sudanese photographers in the French book Soudan 2019, année zéro. This book about the protests that preceded the fall of Sudan's military government of Omar al-Bashir presents accounts and images illustrating different stages and people involved in the Sudanese revolution up to the destruction of the so-called sit-in area by security forces on 3 June 2019.

Running from 4 July to 26 September 2021, the photography festival Rencontres de la photographie at Arles in southern France announced an exhibition on the Sudanese revolution under the title 'Thawra! ثورة Revolution!'. It presented images by Gubara and other Sudanese photographers who contributed to the book Soudan 2019, année zéro. During this festival, Gubara won the photography award Prix de la photo Madame Figaro – Arles 2021 for her Photo Story «Kandakas can't be stopped» by the French women's magazine Madame Figaro, which entailed the commission for a fashion photo editorial for the magazine. Her pictures of Senegalese fashion model Samb Fatou were published in the magazine's Juli 1st edition in 2022.

In collaboration with the International Film Festival and Forum on Human Rights (FIFDH), the International Red Cross and Red Crescent Museum in Geneva invited Gubara for a masterclass discussion on Gender & Diversity on 8 March 2022.

See also 
Photography in Sudan
Visual arts of Sudan
Soudan 2019, année zéro

References

External links 

Sudan. The history of an uprising Photo exhibition at Recontres de la photographie Arles, 2021
Video of workshop and exhibition Mugran Foto Encounter 2015, Sudan, featuring Eythar Gubara (0:38") and other Sudanese photographers
Many Rivers, One Nile, photographic slide-show 2014, featuring Gubara's story Fishing on the Nile (12:15") and other Sudanese photographers

1988 births
Sudanese photographers
People from Khartoum
Living people
21st-century Sudanese artists
Sudanese women artists
Sudanese women photographers